These are the results of the 1994 Ibero-American Championships in Athletics which took place from 27 to 30 October 1994 at Estadio Municipal Teodoro Bronzini in Mar del Plata, Argentina.

Men's results

100 meters

Heat 1 – 27 October
Wind: -2.5 m/s

Heat 2 – 27 October
Wind: -3.7 m/s

Final – 28 October
Wind: +3.2 m/s

200 meters

Heat 1 – 29 October
Wind: -0.8 m/s

Heat 2 – 29 October
Wind: -1.5 m/s

Heat 3 – 29 October
Wind: -2.1 m/s

Final – 30 October
Wind: +1.2 m/s

400 meters

Heat 1 – 27 October

Heat 2 – 27 October

Final – 28 October

800 meters

Heat 1 – 29 October

†: Only the last name is known.  The full name was assigned tentatively.

Heat 2 – 29 October

†: Only the last name is known.  The full name was assigned tentatively.

Final – 29 October

1500 meters
Final – 28 October

5000 meters
Final – 27 October

10,000 meters
Final – 29 October

110 meters hurdles

Heat 1 – 27 October
Wind: -2.3 m/s

Heat 2 – 27 October
Wind: -2.1 m/s

Final – 28 October
Wind: +2.0 m/s

400 meters hurdles

Heat 1 – 29 October

Heat 2 – 29 October

Final – 30 October

3000 meters steeplechase
Final – 30 October

High jump
Final – 29 October

Pole vault
Final – 27 October

Long jump
Final – 27 October

Triple jump
Final – 30 October

Shot put
Final – 30 October

Discus throw
Final – 27 October

Hammer throw
Final – 29 October

Javelin throw
Final – 28 October

Decathlon
Final – 28–29 October

‡: It is reported that the result of Diego Martín Kerwitz should be corrected to 6.245 pts, because the 100m time of 11.78 corresponds to 695 pts rather than 701 pts.

20 kilometers walk
Final – 29 October

4x100 meters relay
Final – 27 October

4x400 meters relay
Final – 30 October

Women's results

100 meters
Final – 28 October
Wind: +1.6 m/s

200 meters

Heat 1 – 29 October
Wind: -0.7 m/s

Heat 2 – 29 October
Wind: -0.6 m/s

Final – 30 October
Wind: +4.4 m/s

400 meters
Final – 28 October

800 meters
Final – 30 October

1500 meters
Final – 28 October

3000 meters
Final – 30 October

10,000 meters
Final – 28 October

100 meters hurdles
Final – 28 October
Wind: +3.3 m/s

400 meters hurdles
Final – 30 October

High jump
Final – 28 October

Long jump
Final – 29 October

Triple jump
Final – 30 October

Shot put
Final – 29 October

Discus throw
Final – 27 October

Hammer throw
Final – 30 October

Javelin throw
Final – 28 October

Heptathlon
Final – 28–29 October

‡: It is reported that the result of Zorobabelia Córdoba should be corrected to 5.221 pts, because the 800m time of 2:32.01 corresponds to 668 pts rather than 681 pts.

10,000 meters walk
Final – 28 October

4x100 meters relay
Final – 27 October

†: Only the last name is known.  The full name was assigned tentatively.

4x400 meters relay
Final – 30 October

References

Ibero-American
Events at the Ibero-American Championships in Athletics